Malekshahi County is in Ilam province, Iran. The capital of the county is the city of Arkavaz. At the 2006 census, the region's population (as Malekshahi District of Mehran County) was 31,393 in 5,722 households. The following census in 2011 counted 22,587 people in 5,626 households, by which time the district had been separated from the county to form Malekshahi County. At the 2016 census, the county's population was 21,138 in 6,022 households. The Malekshahi tribe is the largest Kurdish tribe in Ilam.

The name in Persian (ملگشاهی) is from the old name, Melkishi, a Kurdish  tribe spread from Ilam to Ardahan province in Turkey. There is a Georgian counterpart to this tribe, namely the Melikishvili. The Malekshahi of the largest tribes in Iran, Iraq and Turkey. Melikshahi Kurdish language and dialect is Malekshahi.

Administrative divisions

The population history and structural changes of Malekshahi County's administrative divisions over three consecutive censuses are shown in the following table. The latest census shows two districts, four rural districts, and three cities.

References

 

Counties of Ilam Province